= Josephine Chaus =

Josephine Augello Chaus (August 25, 1951, Brooklyn - November 25, 2015, Manhattan) was a fashion executive and with her husband, Bernard Chaus (born 1928 or 1929), co-founded Bernard Chaus Inc; one of the largest producers of women's sportswear and dresses in the world.
