= Bernard Chaus =

Bernard Chaus (born 1928 or 1929 - died May 31, 1991, Manhattan) was a fashion executive and with his wife, Josephine Chaus, co-founded Bernard Chaus Inc; one of the largest producers of women's sportswear and dresses in the world. He served as the company's chairman and chief executive.
